Legislative elections were held in Russia on 18 September 2016. On 5 October 2016 Sergey Naryshkin resigned because of his appointment as Director of SVR. On 14 June, the Central Election Commission scheduled an election in the Kingisepp constituency for 10 September 2017.

Results by 112  Kingisepp constituency 2016

United Russia primary 
On May 28, 2017, the United Russia held primary for the selection of candidate in Kingisepp's Constituency. The primary was attended by eight people. It was possible to vote for multiple candidates.

Candidates

Registered
United Russia: Sergey Yakhnyuk, Vice-Governor of Leningrad Oblast - Chairman of regional Committee for agriculture and fishing industry
Communist Party: Nikolay Kuzmin, former deputy of State Duma (2014-2016), 2016 candidate for State Duma for this seat
Liberal Democratic Party: Natalya Kruglova, actress
A Just Russia: Marina Lyubushkina, 2016 candidate for State Duma for this seat
Communists of Russia: Konstantin Zhukov, executive secretary of the Central Committee of Communists of Russia
Yabloko (with the support of the People's Freedom Party): Sergey Gulyaev, journalist, Second Chechen War veteran, former deputy of Legislative Assembly of Leningrad Oblast (2002-2007)
Party of Pensioners: Andrey Shirokov, president of Assistance Fund for Regional Projects and Programs, former deputy of  Moscow City Duma (1997-2001), 2016 candidate for State Duma
Rodina: Valery Shinkarenko, lawyer, 2016 candidate for State Duma in the Volkhov constituency
Patriots of Russia: Serik Urazov, businessman

Result

|-
! colspan=2 style="background-color:#E9E9E9;text-align:left;vertical-align:top;" |Candidate
! style="background-color:#E9E9E9;text-align:left;vertical-align:top;" |Party
! style="background-color:#E9E9E9;text-align:right;" |Votes
! style="background-color:#E9E9E9;text-align:right;" |%
|-
|style="background-color: " |
|Sergey Yakhnyuk
|United Russia
|61,420
|61.6%
|-
|style="background-color: " |
|Nikolay Kuzmin
|Communist Party
|11,269
|11.3%
|-
|style="background-color: " |
|Marina Lyubushkina
|A Just Russia
|6,942
|7.0%
|-
|style="background-color: " |
|Natalya Kruglova
|Liberal Democratic Party
|5,198
|5.2%
|-
|style="background: #1E90FF;"| 
|Andrey Shirokov
|Party of Pensioners
|3,714	
|3.7%
|-
|style="background-color: " |
|Sergey Gulyaev
|Yabloko
|3,138			
|3.2%
|-
|style="background: #E62020;"| 
|Konstantin Zhukov
|Communists of Russia
|3,040		
|3.0%
|-
|style="background-color: " |
|Valery Shinkarenko
|Rodina
|1,109	
|1.1%
|-
|style="background-color: " |
|Serik Urazov
|Patriots of Russia
|758		
|0.7%
|-
| colspan="5" style="background-color:#E9E9E9;"|
|- style="font-weight:bold"
| colspan="3" style="text-align:left;" | Total
| 96,588
| 100%
|-
| colspan="5" style="background-color:#E9E9E9;"|
|- style="font-weight:bold"
| colspan="4" |Source:
|
|}

External links
CEC Russia
112 Kingisepp Results primary election United Russia

References

2017
2017 elections in Russia
7th State Duma of the Russian Federation
By-elections to the 7th Russian State Duma